Hagenia is a monotypic genus of flowering plant with the sole species Hagenia abyssinica, native to the high-elevation Afromontane regions of central and eastern Africa. It also has a disjunct distribution in the high mountains of East Africa from Sudan and Ethiopia in the north, through Kenya, Uganda, Rwanda, Burundi, Democratic Republic of Congo, and Tanzania, to Malawi and Zambia in the south. A member of the rose family, its closest relative is the Afromontane genus Leucosidea.

Nomenclature 
It is known in English as African redwood, East African rosewood,  brayera, cusso, hagenia, or kousso, in Amharic as kosso, and in Swahili as mdobore or mlozilozi. Synonyms of the species include Banksia abyssinica, Brayera anthelmintica, Hagenia abyssinica var. viridifolia and Hagenia anthelmintica.

Description

It is a tree up to 20 m in height, with a short trunk, thick branches, and thick, peeling bark. The leaves are up to 40 cm long, compound with 7-13 leaflets, each leaflet about 10 cm long with a finely serrated margin, green above, silvery-haired below. The flowers are white to orange-buff or pinkish-red, produced in panicles 30–60 cm long.

Distribution
It is generally found from 2000–3000 m elevation, in areas receiving 1000–1500 mm of rainfall annually. It can be found growing in mixed afromontane forest with Podocarpus, Afrocarpus, and other trees, and in drier afromontane forests and woodlands where Hagenia is dominant, or in mixed stands of Hagenia and Juniperus procera.  It is often found near the upper limit of forest growth, giving way to giant heather zones above it.

Ecology
Hagenia is used as a food plant by the larvae of some Lepidoptera species including turnip moth.

References

External links
Hagenia abyssinica at the AgroForestry Tree Database (World Agroforestry Centre)
"The Kosso Tree" is a watercolor by William Simpson from 1868
 

Agrimoniinae
Afromontane flora
Trees of Africa
Trees of the Democratic Republic of the Congo
Trees of Ethiopia
Medicinal plants of Africa
Monotypic Rosaceae genera
Plant dyes
Taxa named by Johann Friedrich Gmelin